Patrick Kelly is an Irish Gaelic footballer who plays for Mountbellew–Moylough and at senior level for the Galway county team.

Kelly played for Galway in the 2022 All-Ireland Senior Football Championship Final. He scored two goals for Galway to help them overcome Leitrim and gain a place in the 2022 Connacht Senior Football Championship final.

Kelly has also played association football (soccer) for Athlone Town.

References

Year of birth missing (living people)
Living people
Athlone Town A.F.C. players
Gaelic footballers who switched code
Galway inter-county Gaelic footballers
Mountbellew–Moylough Gaelic footballers